Said Al Muzayin (1935 – 29 March 1991) (Arabic: سعيد المزين) was a prominent Palestinian poet who wrote the lyrics of the Palestinian national anthem.

Early life and education 
Al Muyazin was born in 1935 in Ashdod, Mandatory Palestine, where he was also educated. In 1948, after the Nakba, he migrated to the Gaza Strip.

Career 
In Gaza, he operated a printing press, and was arrested by Israelis, before taking part in the early resistance movement in 1956. He later worked as a history teacher, moving in 1957 to Saudi Arabia to teach there. In 1959, he flew to Damascus to work in the Palestinian Liberation Organisation.

From 1973 to 1978, he was representative of the Palestinian National Liberation Movement in Saudi Arabia.

At an unknown date he wrote the lyrics of "", a song set to music by the composer Ali Ismael that in 1996 was made the Palestinian National Anthem by the PLO.

Selected literary works 

 "I'm Steadfast", poem, c. 1970
 "Tubas", poem
 "Safar al-Saif", poem
 "فدائية" (Fedayeen), poem
 في خندق الأخلاق  (In the Trench of Ethics), book
 Essays on the Revolution, book, Cairo, 1986
 Safar al-Fath, collection of poems
 A People Will Not Die, play
 The House of Our Father, play
 Al-Mawda, play
 "وثيقة الدماء" ("The Document of Blood"), story
 "الدورية 96" ("The Patrol 96")

Death 
Al Muzayin died in Riyadh on 29 March 1991.

References 

20th-century Palestinian poets
1935 births
1991 deaths
National anthem writers
Palestinian male poets
Date of birth missing
20th-century male writers
Deaths in Saudi Arabia
People from Ashdod
Palestinian political writers

External links
 Flags, Symbols & Currency Of Palestine (including notes on and lyrics of the national anthem)

Palestinian poets